Curtin Immigration Detention Centre is an Australian immigration detention facility in the Kimberley in Western Australia at 17°36'14.58"S 123°49'14.28"E. Curtin was described by former Immigration minister, Philip Ruddock, as the country's "most primitive" processing centre. It was shut down by the Howard Government following a riot in 2002 but was re-opened in 2010 by its successor - the Rudd-Gillard Government. Being run by Serco Asia Pacific who also run Villawood and other detention centres in Australia. The controversial move has been seen by commentators as a reversal by the Australian Labor Party of its policy towards detention.

Notable Detainees
Munjed Al Muderis Iraqi asylum seeker and pioneering Osteointegration surgeon, and human rights activist.

Abdul Hekmat, Hazara refugee and journalist contributing to The Monthly magazine, The Saturday Paper and The Guardian, among other publications.

See also
RAAF Curtin (location of centre) 
List of Australian immigration detention facilities

References

External links

Remote Curtin detention centre was closed for a reason

Immigration detention centres and prisons of Australia
Private prisons in Australia
Kimberley (Western Australia)